Garra dembecha is a species of cyprinid fish in the genus Garra from East Africa.

References 

Garra
Fish described in 2007
Cyprinid fish of Africa